The 2022 Maharlika Pilipinas Basketball League (MPBL) Finals (also known as the 2022 MPBL Mumbaki Cup Finals), was the best-of-5 championship series of the 2022 MPBL season and the conclusion of the season's playoffs. The Nueva Ecija Rice Vanguards, the MPBL Northern Division champion, and Zamboanga Family's Brand Sardines as the MPBL Southern Division Champion, competed for the fourth championship contested by the league. This was the first MPBL finals to implement a 2–2–1 home game format due to geographical reasons. The Nueva Ecija Rice Vanguards wins the national championship title after defeating Zamboanga Family's Brand Sardines 3–1 game series. John Byron Villarias named as the 2022 MPBL Finals MVP.

Background

Nueva Ecija Rice Vanguards
The Nueva Ecija Rice Vanguards debuted in the 2019–20 MPBL season,  they placed 11th in the Northern Division. They finished the 2021 MPBL Invitational as runner-up after being defeated by the Basilan Peace Riders on a game winning basket in overtime. They finished the regular season with a 21–0 win-loss record, thus, the Rice Vanguards were able to clinch the first seed and home court advantage throughout the playoffs. In the first two rounds of the playoffs, The Rice Vanguards easily won against the Marikina Shoemasters and the Pampanga Giant Lanterns both in two games each. In the Northern Division Finals, they met the 2021 season runner-up San Juan Knights, battling for the Northern Division title. In Game 1, the Rice Vanguards was defeated by the Knights for the first time this season, but they manage to win the next two games. This was the first national championship appearance for the Rice Vanguards.

Zamboanga Family's Brand Sardines 
The Zamboanga Family's Brand Sardines debuted in the 2018–19 MPBL season where they were the 6th seed, and reached the Southern Division Semifinals. Zamboanga ended their regular season with 18–3 win-loss record, to become the top seed in the South Division and clinch home court advantage for the division playoffs. They easily defeated the Muntinlupa Cagers in the first round and then forced a Game 3 against the Bacolod Bingo Plus in the Division Semifinals. In the division finals, they faced the 2018 MPBL Rajah Cup Champions Batangas City Embassy Chill they lost the first game, but forced Game 3 and won, to claim its division title and advance to its first ever national championship appearance.

Road to the Finals

Head-to-head matchup

Series summary

MPBL Finals Series

Game 1

Game 2

Game 3

Game 4

Broadcast notes 
One PH and One Sports + is the official broadcaster of the 2022 Finals, also simulcast via Facebook, YouTube, and Kumu.

Prizes 
The national champion will receive the National Championship Trophy, and ball rings which will await the National Champions as per league founder Manny Pacquiao and Commissioner Kenneth Duremdes.

References 

Maharlika Pilipinas Basketball League
2022 in Philippine sport